Willoughby Bus Depot is a bus depot in the Sydney suburb of Willoughby operated by Busways.

History
Willoughby Bus Depot opened on 1 July 1958 on the site of a former tannery. It operated routes, which were a combination of tram replacement routes and existing services operated by North Sydney Bus Depot. 

In January 2022 it was included in the transfer of region 7 from State Transit to Busways.

As of November 2022, it has an allocation of 159 buses.

References

External links
Service NSW

Bus garages
Industrial buildings in Sydney
Transport infrastructure completed in 1958
1958 establishments in Australia